Cynthia Jean Cameron Breakspeare (born October 24, 1954) is a Canadian-Jamaican jazz singer, musician and beauty queen. Breakspeare was crowned Miss World 1976. Breakspeare is the mother of reggae musician Damian Marley, through her relationship with Bob Marley, who remained married to Rita Marley until his death. Marley is said to have written the songs "Turn Your Lights Down Low" and "Waiting in Vain" about her.

Life and career
Breakspeare was born in Toronto, Ontario, Canada, to a Jamaican father, Louis Breakspeare, who was a British-Jamaican of multiracial ancestry, and a white Canadian mother of British origin, Marguerite Cochrane. She has three brothers and one sister. Breakspeare moved to Jamaica when she was four years old, and attended the Immaculate Conception High School, graduating in 1973. As a teenager, Breakspeare participated in beauty pageants, including Miss Jamaica Body Beautiful and Miss Universe Bikini. She was invited to participate in the Miss World competition in 1976 held in London. Despite Jamaica's anti-apartheid protest of the pageant, Breakspeare accepted the invitation and won the title on November 19, 1976, becoming the second Jamaican to do so.

Personal life
Breakspeare had a relationship with reggae musician Bob Marley beginning in 1977, lasting until his death in 1981. Marley was in relationships with several other women around this time, including Prescaline Bongo and another woman who gave birth to his child in 1981. From Cindy's relationship with Bob she birthed a son, Damian Marley (aka Jr. Gong), in 1978. Three years later, Breakspeare married senator Tom Tavares-Finson in 1981, with whom she has a son, Christian (b. 1982), and a daughter, Leah (b. 1986). Breakspeare and Tavares-Finson later divorced in 1995. Breakspeare married musician Rupert Bent II in 1999. Breakspeare has been pursuing her career as a recording artist and entrepreneur. She founded a Rastafarian craft store called Ital Craf in Jamaica. Breakspeare has four grandsons from her three children. Breakspeare remains a personality in Jamaica, occasionally featuring in local media.

Filmography
 Marley (2012), interviewee

References

External links
Jamaican Hall Of Fame: Cindy Breakspeare

1954 births
Canadian people of Jamaican descent
Canadian people of British descent
20th-century Black Canadian women singers
Jamaican female models
Marley family
Miss Jamaica World winners
Miss World winners
Miss World 1976 delegates
Canadian emigrants to Jamaica
Musicians from Kingston, Jamaica
Musicians from Toronto
Living people